Matthew Hatch (born 24 September 2000) is an Australian professional footballer who plays as a midfielder for A-League club Perth Glory.

Honours
Central Coast Mariners Academy
 National Premier Leagues NSW 2 Premiership: 2020
 National Premier Leagues NSW 2 Championship: 2020

Records
 Fastest debut goal in the A-League: 25 seconds

References

External links

2000 births
Living people
Australian soccer players
Association football defenders
Central Coast Mariners FC players
Central Coast Mariners Academy players
National Premier Leagues players
A-League Men players